Abū Isḥāq Muḥammad ibn al-Wāthiq (‎;  – 21 June 870), better known by his regnal name al-Muhtadī bi-'llāh (Arabic: , "Guided by God"), was the Caliph of the Abbasid Caliphate from July 869 to June 870, during the "Anarchy at Samarra".

Early life

Al-Muhtadi was the son of Abbasid caliph al-Wathiq. He was born in 833. Al-Muhtadi's mother was Qurb, a Greek slave. After the death of his father, Caliph al-Wathiq in August 847, there were some officials who wanted to elect the young al-Muhtadi as caliph, but in the end, their choice fell on his uncle, al-Mutawakkil.

Background
Despite the successes of caliph al-Mu'tazz, He could not overcome the main problem of the period: a shortage of revenue with which to pay the troops. The financial straits of the Caliphate had become evident already at his accession—the customary accession donative of ten months' pay for the troops had to be reduced to two for lack of funds—and had helped bring down the regime of al-Musta'in in Baghdad. The civil war and the ensuing general anarchy only worsened the situation, as revenue stopped coming in even from the environs of Baghdad, let alone more remote provinces. As a result, al-Mu'tazz refused to honour his agreement with Ibn Tahir in Baghdad, leaving him to provide for his own supporters; this led to unrest in the city and the rapid decline of Tahirid family. The turmoil in Baghdad was worsened by al-Mu'tazz, who in 869 dismissed Ibn Tahir's brother and successor Ubaydallah, and replaced him with his far less capable brother Sulayman. In the event, this only served to deprive the Caliph of a useful counterweight against the Samarra soldiery, and allowed the Turks to regain their former power.

Accession
By 869 the Turkic leaders Salih ibn Wasif and Ba'ikbak were again in the ascendant, and secured the removal of Ahmad ibn Isra'il. Finally, unable to meet the financial demands of the Turkic troops, in mid-July a palace coup deposed al-Mu'tazz. He was imprisoned and maltreated to such an extent that he died after three days, on 16 July 869. He was succeeded by his cousin al-Muhtadi.

Caliphate
After the deposition and murder of his cousin al-Mu'tazz on 15 July 869, the leaders of the Turkic guard chose al-Muhtadi as the new Caliph on 21/22 July. As a ruler, al-Muhtadi sought to emulate the Umayyad caliph Umar ibn Abd al-Aziz, widely considered a model Islamic ruler. He therefore lived an austere and pious life—notably removing all musical instruments from the court—and made a point of presiding in person over the courts of grievances (mazalim), thus gaining the support of the common people. Combining "strength and ability", he was determined to restore the Caliph's authority and power, that had been eroded during the ongoing "Anarchy at Samarra" by the squabbles of the Turkish generals.

Al-Muhtadi faced Alid risings in the provinces, but the main threat to his power were the Turkish commanders. The dominant figure of the first months of his rule was Salih ibn Wasif, but he too failed to provide enough revenue to pay the troops. Although he executed the previous vizier, Ahmad ibn Isra'il, and his extortion of the secretaries (kuttab), his power continued to wane. His main rival, Musa ibn Bugha, used the opportunity to return from his semi-exile in Hamadhan, arriving in Samarra in December 869. There he constrained al-Muhtadi to take an oath to punish Salih for having robbed the treasures of Kabiha, the mother of al-Mu'tazz. Salih went into hiding, whereupon the Turks mutinied and almost deposed al-Muhtadi. They relented only when he promised them to pardon Salih, but when Salih did not appear, his soldiers began to pillage Samarra, until Musa and his troops scattered them. Soon after, Salih was discovered and executed by Musa's men. Musa thus established himself as the leading official of the government, with Sulayman ibn Wahb as his chief secretary.

Historian Khatib states that he adopted perpetual fasting from the day of his leadership until his murder.

Downfall and death
When Musa left to campaign against the Kharijites, al-Muhtadi took the opportunity to incite the people against him and his brother, Muhammad. Muhammad was brought to trial on accusations of embezzlement and was condemned. Although al-Muhtadi had promised a pardon, Muhammad was executed. This cemented the rift with Musa: the latter marched on the capital with his army, and defeated the troops loyal to the Caliph. He refused to abdicate, but tried to preserve his life and office by recourse to the religious status of the caliph, and the support of the people. He was nevertheless murdered on 21 June 870, and replaced by his cousin, al-Mu'tamid.

Ja'far ibn Abd al-Wahid ibn Ja'far led the prayers at the funeral of the caliph al-Muhtadi.

References

Sources 
 
 
 
 
 
 
 
 
 

833 births
870 deaths
Arab Muslims
9th-century births
Year of birth unknown
9th-century Abbasid caliphs
9th-century murdered monarchs
Assassinated caliphs
Arab people of Greek descent
Sons of Abbasid caliphs